A Christmas Prince: The Royal Wedding is a 2018 American Christmas romantic comedy film directed by John Schultz from a screenplay by Robin Bernheim and Nathan Atkins, based on characters created by Karen Schaler. The film stars Rose McIver, Ben Lamb, Sarah Douglas, Alice Krige and Tahirah Sharif. It is a sequel to the 2017 film A Christmas Prince. It was followed in 2019 by A Christmas Prince: The Royal Baby.

It was released on November 30, 2018, by Netflix.

Plot
One year after the events of the first film, Amber and Richard are still happily engaged. Amber's news media company that she worked for went out of business and her friends are unemployed. At Christmastime, Amber and her father, Rudy, travel to Aldovia to plan Amber's wedding. Amber continues to blog about royal life with Richard.

Amber becomes overwhelmed with the dictatorial traditions of royal protocol and lack of control over her own wedding, which is controlled by the flamboyant designer Sahil and Mrs. Averill, as Richard struggles with the failing implementation of his Aldovian economic revitalization program, the New Aldovia initiative, which is mysteriously hemorrhaging money from the monarchy as unemployment and low wages afflict the increasingly discontent populace. To assist in the economic efforts, Queen Helena brings in Lord Leopold to assist Richard, as Leopold had been planning aid efforts with Richard's late father. Meanwhile, Simon, impoverished due to his divorce from Sophia, also returns to beg to be brought back into the palace; a resentful Richard reluctantly accepts, as Simon is family.

Amber and Richard's relationship grows strained as Richard becomes increasingly distracted with royal demands, and Amber refuses to kowtow to Mrs. Averill's strict guidelines. After Princess Emily's play is cancelled due to a strike by governmental workers, Amber hosts the play at the palace. While the move was well-received, Amber becomes furious when Mrs. Averill takes down posts from her blog about the affair due to their casual nature, and is further upset when Sahil and Mrs. Averill demand she remove her locket (containing her late mother's photo) for a royal portrait.

After receiving a bitter Christmas card from an unemployed worker, Amber investigates the royal finances with her friends, who have come to celebrate her wedding. She learns that the New Aldovia initiative has been failing because a group of new companies has been outbidding local workers and taking the money out of the country. During a paparazzi ambush, she's saved by Simon, who wants to help investigate the economic issue. With Emily's help, the group hacks into a site that the shell companies are owned by an association, Glockenspiel Consortium. Mrs. Averill confronts Richard and Amber over paparazzi photos of Amber at a bar while investigating, and Amber admits to the sleuthing. When Richard fails to defend her against Mrs. Averill, she storms out. Richard admits his failings as a fiancé to Emily, and after finding Amber, the two reconcile.

During a royal celebration, where Helena gives Amber the blessing to have the ceremony she wants, the group reveals that Glockenspiel Consortium is owned by Leopold, who is accosted and thrown into the palace dungeon. Richard gives a Christmas address that promises holiday bonuses to all Aldovian workers, and the populace celebrates. Richard and Amber finally marry in a ceremony that blends tradition with modernity, and everyone celebrates as Richard and Amber leave to share a private kiss.

Cast

Production
In May 2018, it was reported that John Schultz would direct a sequel to the 2017 film A Christmas Prince which would be distributed by Netflix. Alongside the initial announcement, it was confirmed that Rose McIver, Ben Lamb,  and Alice Krige would reprise their roles in the film. Principal photography began in May 2018 in Romania.

Release
It was released on November 30, 2018 by Netflix.

Reception

Sequel
A third film, titled A Christmas Prince: The Royal Baby was announced by Netflix in March 2019. The sequel premiered on December 5, 2019.

See also 
 List of Christmas films

References

External links
 

2010s Christmas films
2018 romantic comedy films
American Christmas films
American romantic comedy films
American sequel films
American Christmas comedy films
2010s English-language films
Films about royalty
Films about weddings
Films directed by John Schultz (director)
Films set in a fictional country
Films shot in Romania
English-language Netflix original films
2010s American films